Heinz Müller (born 24 April 1943) is a retired German football player. He spent three seasons in the Bundesliga with 1. FC Nürnberg.

Honours
 Bundesliga: 1967–68

References

External links
 
 
 Heinz Müller at glubberer.de 

1943 births
Living people
German footballers
Bundesliga players
1. FC Nürnberg players
Association football midfielders